The F class was a type of steam locomotive used by Swedish State Railways and based on the Württemberg C. Eleven locos were built by Nydquist & Holm (NOHAB) between 1914 and 1916. It was primarily used on the main lines between Stockholm-Gothenburg and Stockholm-Malmö. It is one of the largest steam locomotives ever used in Sweden.

The superheated compound locomotive could produce .

Denmark 

During the 1930s the locomotives became obsolete due to electrification of the main lines, and in 1937 were sold to DSB of Denmark, where they served as DSB Class E DSB was so impressed with the performance of the E class that starting 1942, a further 25 locos were built by Frichs of Aarhus. The E class remained in service into the early 1970s. On the death of king Frederik IX the funeral train from Copenhagen to Roskilde on 14 January 1972 was double-headed by two class Es.

Preservation 

Two of the Swedish-built locomotives are preserved and F 1200 is in running condition. Both are owned by the Swedish Railway Museum. Several Frichs-built locomotives are preserved in Denmark, and E 996 at Railworld in Peterborough. F 1200 was involved in a serious accident outside Getå in October 1918.

References

External links 
 Images 
 

Railway locomotives introduced in 1914
Steam locomotives of Sweden
F
NOHAB locomotives
4-6-2 locomotives
Passenger locomotives
Standard gauge locomotives of Sweden
Standard gauge locomotives of Denmark
2′C1′ h4v locomotives